American pop rock band Hey Violet has released two studio albums, five extended plays, eighteen singles, and nineteen music videos.

Studio albums

Extended plays

Singles

Compilations
 Hey Violet Sampler CDr (Virgin, 2016)

Compilation appearances
 Now That's What I Call Music! 61 (Sony/Universal, 2017) - "Guys My Age"
 Just The Hits: Girl Power 2XCD (Universal, 2019) - "Better By Myself"

Music videos

Notes

References

External links
 
 
 
 

Rock music group discographies
Discographies of American artists
Pop music group discographies